Dhuri Assembly constituency (Sl. No.: 107) is a Punjab Legislative Assembly constituency in Sangrur district, Punjab state, India.

Members of the Legislative Assembly

Election results

2022

2017

2015

2012

Previous results

References

External links
 

Assembly constituencies of Punjab, India
Sangrur district